Ippa recitatella is a moth of the family Tineidae first described by Francis Walker in 1864. It is found in Sri Lanka.

References

Moths of Asia
Moths described in 1864
Tineidae